Oleg Dozmorov (born 1974 in Yekaterinburg, Soviet Union) is a Russian writer and poet, the author of several collections of poetry. His poems are translated into Italian, English and Dutch. His International Retreat for Writers fellowship at Hawthornden Castle resulted in a semi-fictional story Premiya "Mramor" (which can be loosely translated into English as Marble Award). It was published by Znamia in 2006. "Vosmistishiya", a 2004 collection of octaves, by Oleg Dozmorov can be found here.

Critique 
About "":

 "" (Take a look at the hippopotamus) – with this book for the first time (for me and probably for others) Oleg Dozmorov has carved his place in the modern poetry.

References

External links 
 Oleg Dozmorov's publications in Russian

Living people
Russian male poets
1974 births
Writers from Yekaterinburg